There have been five baronetcies created for people with the surname Walker, one is extinct, four are extant.

The Walker Baronetcy, of Bushey Hall in the County of Hertfordshire was created in the Baronetage of England on 28 January 1680 for George Walker. After the death of his son, the second Baronet, in 1703, the baronetcy became extinct.

The Walker Baronetcy, of Oakley House in the County of Suffolk was created in the Baronetage of the United Kingdom on 19 July 1856 for Baldwin Wake Walker As of 1997, the baronetcy is held by his great-great-grandson, the fifth Baronet.

The Walker Baronetcy, of Sand Hutton in the County of Yorkshire was created in the Baronetage of the United Kingdom on 9 December 1868 for James Walker. The second Baronet, his son, was a member of parliament for Beverley.

The Walker, later Walker-Okeover Baronetcy, of Gateacre Grange in the County of Lancaster and on Osmaston Manor in the County of Derby, was created in the Baronetage of the United Kingdom on 12 February 1886. For more information on this creation, see Walker-Okeover baronets.

The Walker Baronetcy, of Pembroke House in Dublin was created in the Baronetage of the United Kingdom on 2 July 1906 for Samuel Walker. He was a member of parliament for Londonderry, Solicitor-General for Ireland, Attorney-General for Ireland and eventually Lord Chancellor of Ireland. The fifth Baronet died childless in 2006, and was succeeded by his younger brother.

Walker baronets, of Bushey Hall (1680)
Sir George Walker, 1st Baronet (–1690)
Sir Walter Walker, 2nd Baronet (died 1703)

Walker baronets, of Oakley House (1856)
Sir Baldwin Wake Walker, 1st Baronet (1802–1876)
Sir Baldwin Wake Walker, 2nd Baronet (1846–1905)
Sir Francis Elliot Walker, 3rd Baronet (1851–1928)
Sir Bennett Jay Walker, 4th Baronet (1904–1997)
Sir Mark Jay Walker, 5th Baronet (born 26 August 1961)

Walker baronets, of Sand Hutton (1868)
Sir James Walker, 1st Baronet (1803–1883)
Sir James Robert Walker, 2nd Baronet (1829–1899)
Sir James Heron Walker, 3rd Baronet (1865–1900)
Sir Robert James Milo Walker, 4th Baronet (1890–1930)
Sir James Heron Walker, 5th Baronet (1914–2003)
Sir Victor Stewart Heron Walker, 6th Baronet (born 8 October 1942)

Walker, later Walker-Okeover baronets, of Gateacre Grange and of Osmaston Hall (1886)
see Walker-Okeover baronets

Walker baronets, of Pembroke House (1906)
Sir Samuel Walker, 1st Baronet (1832–1911)
Sir Alexander Arthur Walker, 2nd Baronet (1857–1932)
Sir Cecil Edward Walker, 3rd Baronet (1882–1964)
Sir Hugh Ronald Walker, 4th Baronet (1925–2004)
Sir Robert Cecil Walker, 5th Baronet (1974–2006)
Sir Roy Edward Walker, 6th Baronet (born 10 August 1977)

See also
Forestier-Walker baronets
Walker-Smith baronets

References

Baronetcies in the Baronetage of the United Kingdom
Extinct baronetcies in the Baronetage of England
1680 establishments in England
1856 establishments in the United Kingdom
1868 establishments in the United Kingdom
1886 establishments in the United Kingdom
1906 establishments in the United Kingdom